Thanga Tamil Selvan is an Indian politician. He is a member of the Tamil Nadu Legislative Assembly from Andipatti constituency. Previously, he was a member of Parliament of India representing Tamil Nadu in the Rajya Sabha, the upper house of the Indian Parliament and Member of the Tamil Nadu Legislative Assembly from Andipatti constituency in 2001-2002 period.

Personal life
He completed his post graduate degree in Master of Arts with the University of Madras. He is married 
to Pandyammal and has two children, Shanti and Nishant.

Political career 
Thanga Tamilselvan in June 2019 joined the Dravida Munnetra Kazhagam in the presence of its Working President MK Stalin. He said that the AIADMK, after the demise of the late leader J Jayalalithaa, was being operated by the Bharatiya Janata Party and he don't wanted to lose his self respect.

Election

Tamil Nadu Legislative Assembly Election

Parliamentary Election

2019 Indian general election
He was one of the candidates for Theni (Lok Sabha constituency) but lost in the election. He represented Amma Makkal Munnetra Kazhagam.

References 

Year of birth missing (living people)
Living people
Dravida Munnetra Kazhagam politicians
Rajya Sabha members from Tamil Nadu
Tamil Nadu MLAs 2001–2006
Tamil Nadu MLAs 2011–2016
Tamil Nadu MLAs 2016–2021